Olivia De Couvreur (born 20 February 2000) is a Canadian rugby sevens player. She won a gold medal at the 2019 Pan American Games as a member of the Canada women's national rugby sevens team.

De Couvreur took up the game of rugby after watching the Canadian 7s win bronze at the 2016 Summer Olympics, switching over from soccer. Two years later she competed at the 2018 Summer Youth Olympics where she won a bronze medal as part of the Canadian national team that competed at those games.

In 2022, De Couvreur competed for Canada at the Rugby World Cup Sevens in Cape Town. They placed sixth overall after losing to Fiji in the fifth place final.

References

2000 births
Living people
Canada international rugby sevens players
Female rugby sevens players
Rugby sevens players at the 2019 Pan American Games
Pan American Games gold medalists for Canada
Pan American Games medalists in rugby sevens
Sportspeople from Ottawa
Rugby sevens players at the 2018 Summer Youth Olympics
Medalists at the 2019 Pan American Games
Canada international women's rugby sevens players
Youth Olympic bronze medalists for Canada
Medalists at the 2018 Summer Youth Olympics
Rugby sevens players at the 2022 Commonwealth Games